Merkelbeek is a village in the Dutch province of Limburg. It is located in the municipality of Beekdaelen, about 9 km northwest of Heerlen.

The village was first mentioned in 1283 as Merkelbeke. The etymology is unclear. Merkelbeek started in the Early Middle Ages along a brook and developed into a road village.

The Catholic St Clemens Church is a three-aisled church with built-in tower with needle spire which was built between 1876 and 1878. In 1935, the choir was replaced by a transept and choir in Gothic Revival style.

Merkelbeek was home to 309 people in 1840. It was a separate municipality until 1982, when it became part of Onderbanken. In 2019, it was merged into Beekdaelen.

Gallery

References

External links

Populated places in Limburg (Netherlands)
Former municipalities of Limburg (Netherlands)
Beekdaelen